Gert Jacobus Johannes Britz  (born 14 April 1978) is a South African former rugby union player.

Playing career
Britz matriculated at Grey College and represented the  under-20 team in 1997 and 1998. In 2008 he moved to France and joined USA Perpignan for whom he played 111 matches.

Britz made his test match debut for the Springboks as a replacement against  at the Free State Stadium in Bloemfontein in 2004. During the 2004 rugby season, Britz played ten test matches for the Springboks and then, one test match in each of 2005, 2006 and 2007. He also played one tour matches for the Springboks.

Test history

See also
List of South Africa national rugby union players – Springbok no. 760

References

1978 births
Living people
South African rugby union players
South Africa international rugby union players
Free State Cheetahs players
Western Province (rugby union) players
Bulls (rugby union) players
Lions (United Rugby Championship) players
Stormers players
South Africa international rugby sevens players
Alumni of Grey College, Bloemfontein
Rugby union players from Bloemfontein
Rugby union flankers
Rugby union locks